Buonanotte... avvocato! (translation: Goodnight... Lawyer!) is a 1955 Italian comedy film directed by Giorgio Bianchi.

Plot  
Alberto Santi is a young lawyer who, although love his wife, often longingly thinks to his bachelor life. While his wife has gone to Rome for a conference of Catholic Women, a beautiful stranger named Bianca Maria suddenly swoops in his house, initiating a series of misunderstandings.

Cast  
Alberto Sordi: Alberto Santi
Mara Berni: Bianca Maria
Giulietta Masina: Clara 
Andrea Checchi: Franco 
Vittorio Caprioli:Vittorio 
Tina Pica: Antonia the maid
Turi Pandolfini: Bianca Maria's Grandpa
Attilio Rapisarda: Alfonso Pirani
Nanda Primavera: Donna Elvira 
Ignazio Balsamo: Inspector
Pina Bottin: Marilina 
Natale Cirino: Bicini

References

External links

1955 films
1955 comedy films
Italian comedy films
Films directed by Giorgio Bianchi
Films with screenplays by Ruggero Maccari
Films with screenplays by Giovanni Grimaldi
Italian black-and-white films
1950s Italian films